Charlie Hartfield (born 4 September 1971) is an English former professional footballer who played as a midfielder.

He started out at Arsenal, turning professional in 1989, but never made a first-team appearance. He left Arsenal in 1990 for Sheffield United and went on to play for Fulham (on loan), Swansea City, Lincoln City (on loan), Telford United (on loan), Halifax Town and Ilkeston Town.

During his playing career, Hartfield suffered from a gambling addiction, and in 2006 he still owed debts of "£40,000 or £50,000".

Charlie Hartfield most recently worked as a scout for Sheffield United. In February 2015, he was jailed for nine years and one month after admitting conspiracy to supply amphetamine and cannabis.

References

External links

1971 births
Living people
English footballers
Arsenal F.C. players
Sheffield United F.C. players
Fulham F.C. players
Swansea City A.F.C. players
Lincoln City F.C. players
Telford United F.C. players
Halifax Town A.F.C. players
Ilkeston Town F.C. (1945) players
Premier League players
Footballers from Lambeth
Association football midfielders